The Vector M12 is a sports car manufactured by Vector Aeromotive under parent company Megatech, and was the first car produced after the hostile takeover of the company from Jerry Wiegert by the Indonesian company Megatech. The model was produced from 1995 to 1999, when production was halted due to slow sales of the car. The production totaled 17 units including the prototypes.

History and specifications 
The car was based on the Lamborghini Diablo utilising most of its mechanical components and its V12 engine as Megatech owned Lamborghini at that time and took such steps to produce the car in higher volumes at a low cost. The engine was centrally mounted in front of the gearbox rather than behind it as in the Lamborghini. The styling was a loose copy of the AWX-3, which was a still born project due to the Megatech takeover and later infringed by former company owner Wiegert after he initiated lawsuits and patented the designs to avoid them being reused. The new owners, Megatech, hired designer Peter Stevens to create a more civilised and modern recreation of the AWX-3. This differed from the twin-turbocharged Rodeck V8 engine in the W8 and the AWX-3, as they were considered to be too costly for series production of the new model. The W8 and AWX-3's engines were transversely mounted, unlike the M12's V12 which was longitudinally mounted. The engineering changes placed the cockpit slightly forward than in the AWX-3, with a shorter nose and longer tail.

Production 

Megatech intended the M12 to be a more road-friendly version of the AWX-3, which could get up to 13 miles per gallon of fuel efficiency. 17 cars were produced in total, which included three or four pre-production models and 14 production models. One of the M12 pre-production cars was converted to motorsport specification by the factory, but did not perform successfully due to mechanical problems. This car would again be converted, this time into the SRV8 that was intended to be the successor to the M12.

The M12 production run ended in 1999 when Vector could not pay Lamborghini for the engines. Lamborghini took a W8 as payment, but Wiegert litigated for ownership of that car and won the case. Though the car was not returned.

In the media 
The Vector M12 earned the inauspicious award from Autoweek Magazine as being the worst car ever tested in the history of AutoWeek. In a retrospective, CarThrottle described the M12 as a "botch job" and noted, "would-be customers found it hard to justify spending $189,000 on a canoe-bodied car that was slower, uglier and of lesser build-quality than [the Lamborghini Diablo]." MSN Autos included the M12 on its list of "The World's Worst Supercars".

The M12 is featured in a number of video games, including:
 Gran Turismo 2, as both the production version and as an LM edition;
 Mercedes Benz World Racing, as a downloadable car
 Sports Car GT
 San Francisco Rush
 Rush 2: Extreme Racing USA

References 

Vector Motors
Rear mid-engine, rear-wheel-drive vehicles
Sports cars
Cars introduced in 1995
Cars of the United States